Au Chi-wai (Chinese: 區志偉, born 19 November 1969), sometimes referred to as Au Chi Wai or Chi-wai Au in Western media), is an amateur snooker and pool player from Hong Kong. In snooker, he won (with Marco Fu), the silver medal in the snooker doubles event at the 2002 Asian Games in Busan. Au was also the second runner-up in the 2009 Asian Snooker Championships. In pool, he was the first runner-up in the 2006 Asian 9-Ball Challenge, in Bangkok, on the WPA Asian 9-Ball Tour.

Au's highest snooker  in competition is 147.

Performance and rankings timeline

Top finishes 
 First runner-up - 2002 East Asian Games - Busan (doubles, with Marco Fu)
 First runner-up - 2006 Asian Snooker Challenge (team)
 First runner-up - 2009 Asian 9-Ball Challenge (Bangkok)
 First runner-up - 2004 Asian Snooker Challenge (team)
 Second runner-up - 2009 Asian Snooker Championship

References 

Living people
Hong Kong snooker players
1969 births
Asian Games silver medalists for Hong Kong
Medalists at the 2002 Asian Games
Asian Games medalists in cue sports
Cue sports players at the 2002 Asian Games
Cue sports players at the 2006 Asian Games